The Fort Winnebago Surgeons Quarters is a historic site in Portage, Wisconsin. Located on the eastern bank of the Fox River, about 1.25 miles from the Wisconsin River, the site contains two historic buildings: the "surgeon's quarters" and Garrison School. The "surgeon's quarters", built circa 1824 at the portage by Francois LeRoi and used as a sutler store, then sold to the US Army as a home for the Fort's surgeon.  Garrison School was built circa 1850 near the former Fort property. Both properties are owned, operated, and maintained by the Wisconsin Society Daughters of the American Revolution, which operates it as a historic house museum with 19th century period furnishings and fort artifacts.

History
"The Portage" was a land bridge just 1 1/4 miles wide separating waterways that flow into the Atlantic Ocean to the east and the Gulf of Mexico to the south. The Fox River flows north toward Green Bay, providing access to the Great Lakes, the St. Lawrence River, and the Atlantic Ocean.  The Wisconsin River flows southwest to the Mississippi River, which empties into the Gulf of Mexico. The area around Portage was an early travel route for Native Americans. Centuries before Europeans arrived, they traversed the 2700-pace footpath between the rivers and recognized it as an important travel route.

In the early 1800s, the U.S. government recognized the geographical importance of "le Portage", which became known as "Portage". Fort Winnebago was one of three forts built to subjugate the Native Americans and to protect Euro-American commerce along the Fox-Wisconsin water system in the territory that later became the state of Wisconsin. The other two were Fort Howard in Green Bay and Fort Crawford, in Prairie du Chien.

"By Command of Maj.-Gen. Macomb"
"R. Jones, Adjt.-Gen."
"here was necessity for some means of protection to the fur trade from Winnebago (Ho-Chunk) exactions; ... the general government at the solicitation of John Jacob Astor, who was then at the head of the American Fur Company, and upon whose goods the Indians levied tariffs and tolls, authorized the erection of a post at portage."

The building now known as "the Surgeons Quarters" was built in 1824 by Francois Le Roi and Therese L'Ecuyer, a Métis. In it, they operated a fur trading and sutler's post and a portaging business. It is one of the oldest French colonial log homes in Wisconsin still standing on its original foundation and is the only remaining building of the historic Fort Winnebago, which was active from 1828 through 1845.

During the War of 1812, the British ventured into the territory in an attempt to reclaim this important waterway.

Soldiers arrived to build Fort Winnebago in 1828. The log house was used by the United States Army as a surgeon's quarters for the fort and as an officers' residence. In 1845, the garrison left the fort, ordered west to protect the frontier.

Garrison School, a 19th-century one room schoolhouse that was in use until 1960, was moved from its former location on Garrison Road  to its current site next to the surgeon's quarters.

Notable residents
 John Joseph Abercrombie Lt.
 Jefferson Davis – Lt. 1829-1831
 William S. Harney Cap., Col., Gen.
 John H. Kinzie and Juliette Augusta Magill Kinzie, Indian Sub-Agent
 Randolph B. Marcy – Bvt. Second Lieut., 5th Infantry, 1832-1835
 Edwin Vose Sumner
 David E. Twiggs - Maj.
 Charlotte Ouisconsin Clark Van Cleve
 Horatio P. Van Cleve – Bvt. Second Lieut., 5th Infantry, 1831-1835, 1835-1836

See also
List of the oldest buildings in Wisconsin

References

External links
 

Fur trade
American Fur Company
Pre-statehood history of Wisconsin
People of pre-statehood Wisconsin
Portage, Wisconsin
Buildings and structures in Columbia County, Wisconsin
Museums in Columbia County, Wisconsin
History museums in Wisconsin
Historic house museums in Wisconsin
Open-air museums in Wisconsin
Military and war museums in Wisconsin
Medical museums in the United States
Military facilities on the National Register of Historic Places in Wisconsin
National Register of Historic Places in Columbia County, Wisconsin
1820s establishments in Michigan Territory